The Yield is a 2019 novel by Tara June Winch. She won the 2020 Miles Franklin Award for this book. The book also won the 2020 Voss Literary Prize and the 2020 Prime Minister's Literary Award for fiction.

The novel follows the story of a young Wiradjuri woman returning home to Australia to attend a funeral, and finding her ancestral lands threatened by mining. The novel explores language and features a Wiradjuri language dictionary, as well as themes of colonialism, environmental issues and intergenerational trauma.

References 

2019 Australian novels
Miles Franklin Award-winning works
Hamish Hamilton books
Books about Indigenous Australians

Novels set in New South Wales
Novels about mining
Environmental fiction books
Novels about colonialism
Works about language
Wiradjuri
Penguin Books books